James Lillywhite (17 March 1793 – date of death unknown) was an English cricketer. Lillywhite was born in Tichborne, Hampshire. Lillywhite made a single first-class appearance for Hampshire in 1821 against the Marylebone Cricket Club. In the match he scored 9 runs in Hampshire's first innings and was dismissed for a duck in their second innings by Lord Frederick Beauclerk.

References

External links
James Lillywhite at Cricinfo
James Lillywhite at CricketArchive

1793 births
People from the City of Winchester
English cricketers
Hampshire cricketers
Year of death missing
English cricketers of 1787 to 1825